Centralia (Essery Field) Aerodrome  is adjacent to Centralia, Ontario, Canada.

References

Registered aerodromes in Ontario